This article lists and discusses the usage and derivation of names of small numbers.

Table of names
The following table lists English language names of small numbers used in the long and short scales, along with the power of 10, engineering notation, and  International System of Units (SI) symbols and prefixes.

See also

 Names of large numbers
 Number names
 Numeral prefix
 Metric prefix

References

Numbers
Numeral systems